"Still in the groove" is the eighth single by Japanese singer and voice actress Nana Mizuki.

Track listing 
 Still in the Groove
 Lyrics, composition, arrangement: Toshiro Yabuki
 Theme song for dwango's Iro Melo Mix
 refrain
 Lyrics, composition: Toshiro Yabuki
 Arrangement: Toshiro Yabuki, Tsutomu Ohira
 A new version refrain -clasico- is featured in her album Dream Skipper
 
 Lyrics: Nana Mizuki
 Composition, arrangement: Tsutomu Ohira
 Still In the Groove (Vocalless ver.)
 refrain (Vocalless ver.)
  (Vocalless ver.)

Charts

2003 singles
Nana Mizuki songs